Dancing Lessons for the Advanced in Age is a 1964 novel by the Czech writer Bohumil Hrabal. It tells the story of a man who recounts various events from his past, and in particular his love life. The novel is written in one long sentence.

Reception
The book was reviewed in Publishers Weekly in 1995, where the critic described it as a "humorous and breathless affair". The review continued: "Hrabal, who has been cited as a major literary influence by Milan Kundera and Ivan Klima, among others, is generally considered the most revered living Czech author. It's easy to see why. As this novel (originally published in Czech in 1964) plays around with Czech history, juxtaposing the public life of the country with the private life of the narrator, Hrabal displays abounding energy and a rambunctious wit." Howard Norman of the Los Angeles Times wrote that it "stands up to the best of Hrabal", and argued that his novels "distill complicated human behavior to its basic--albeit at times repugnant, at times joyful--motivations".

See also
 1964 in literature
 Czech literature

References

1964 Czech novels
Novels by Bohumil Hrabal